Garry Lund is an association football player who represented New Zealand.

Lund made his full All Whites debut in a 2–1 win over Fiji on 19 September 1986 and ended his international playing career with 15 A-international caps and 1 goal to his credit, his final cap earned in a 0–1 loss to Saudi Arabia on 24 April 1993.

References

External links

Living people
New Zealand association footballers
New Zealand international footballers

Association footballers not categorized by position

Year of birth missing (living people)